The Blue Ridge Quartet (1946 – 1985) was a Southern gospel music group founded in 1946.

History
The Blue Ridge Quartet was organized by Frank Stamps's Stamps Quartet Music Company of Texas. They started in Raleigh, North Carolina, but ultimately settled in Spartanburg, South Carolina.

When they began in Raleigh at the beginning of 1946 they operated out of radio station WRAL. Among the original members of the group in 1946 were Leonard "Red" Mathis, tenor; James Smith, lead; Wayne Roseberry, baritone; Shaw Eiland, bass; and William Cunningham, pianist. Eiland and Roseberry were former members of the Stamps-Baxter Lone Star Quartet, also headquartered in Raleigh. After a short time, J. Elmo Fagg and Jack Taylor, both from the Lone Star Quartet, joined them. It wasn't long before Wayne Roseberry left and Everett Payne became the baritone singer.

Burl Strevel joined the quartet in 1947 to sing bass, and they moved over to WDBB radio in Burlington, NC. In 1948 they moved to WSPA radio Spartanburg, SC and dropped the "Stamps" name. Former Lone Star Quartet lead and baritone Clarence Turbyfill joined to sing tenor. In 1949, Kenny Gates became the Blue Ridge Quartet's pianist. When Turbyfill left in 1950, Ed Sprouse became the group's tenor. When Payne left in 1953, Gates picked up the additional duty of singing the baritone part. This lineup of Sprouse, Fagg, Gates, and Strevel remained together for a number of years.

Around 1956, Strevel left to join the Sunshine Boys. After some turnover, the bass slot was filled by George Younce. Jim Hamill was hired for the baritone slot with Gates remaining at piano. After a year or so, Bill Crowe replaced Hamill and began a long tenure with the Blue Ridge Quartet.

When George Younce left the group to join the Cathedral Quartet in 1964, Burl Strevel returned to sing bass. Shortly after, former Sunshine Boys member Fred Daniel replaced Ed Sprouse at the tenor position.

When Fagg retired in 1968, he was replaced by Laverne Tripp. Beginning in the 1970s there were several years of unprecedented chart success and group popularity. Don Seabolt replaced Fred Daniel in 1972 and Jim Wood  also filled the lead slot later in the decade.

The Blue Ridge Quartet shared a number one song on the Singing News chart with the Oak Ridge Boys from February through November 1971. The song was "I Know." Other number one songs for the group include “That Day Is Almost Here” (December 1971-February 1972) and “After Calvary” (October–November 1972).

Burl Strevel died of a heart attack on November 12, 1981. After that point, Bill Crowe owned and managed the group until they disbanded in January 1985.

References

American gospel musical groups
Gospel quartets
Musical groups established in 1946
Southern gospel performers